Khalid bin Hamad bin Abdullah bin Jassim bin Muhammed Al Thani (born 1935 in Doha) is a former Minister of Interior of Qatar, as which he served from 1972 to 1989.

He is the son of Sheikh Hamad bin Abdullah Al Thani and Sheikha Sara bint Mohammed Al Thani and the grandson of Abdullah bin Jassim Al Thani and Mohammed bin Jassim Al Thani. After the coup of 1972 his half-brother Sheikh Khalifa bin Hamad Al Thani appointed him as the Minister of the Interior.

Children
Sheikh Khalid has 11 daughters and 14 sons:

Sheikh Hamad bin Khalid Al Thani, he has 2 sons and 3 daughters
Sheikh Jassim bin Hamad Al Thani
Sheikh Khalifa bin Hamad Al Thani
Sheikha Noor bint Hamad Al Thani
Sheikha Nouf bint hamad Al Thani
Sheikha Sara bint hamad Al Thani
Sheikh Mohammed bin Khalid Al Thani, State Minister and member of Cabinet. Married, 6 sons and 8 daughters
Sheikh Abdullah bin Khalid Al Thani, he has 19 daughters and 23 sons
Sheikh Abdulaziz bin Khalid Al Thani, married, 17 sons
Sheikh Nasir bin Khalid Al Thani, chairman of QID, married, 2 sons and 6 daughters
Sheikh Saud bin Khalid Al Thani, current president of Al-Rayyan SC, married, 5 sons and 5 daughters
Sheikh Abdulrahman bin Khalid Al Thani, married, 4 sons and 3 daughters
Sheikh Ahmed bin Khalid Al Thani, married, 2 sons and 3 daughters
Sheikh Jassim bin Khalid Al Thani, married, 3 sons
Sheikh Suhaim bin Khalid Al Thani, married, 2 sons and 2 daughters
Sheikh Khalifa bin Khalid Al Thani
Sheikh Falah bin Khalid Al Thani
Sheikha Aisha bint Khalid Al Thani, Married to Sheikh Abdulrahman bin Hassan Alabdulrahman Al Thani, 2 sons and 4 daughters
Sheikha Noora bint Khalid Al Thani, married to Emir Sheikh Hamad bin Khalifa Al Thani, 4 sons and 5 daughters
Sheikha Jawahir bint Khalid Al Thani, married Sheikh Faysal bin Nasir bin Hamad Al Thani, 1 son and 1 daughter
Sheikha Muna bint Khalid Al Thani, married, 3 daughters 
Sheikha Naila bint Khalid Al Thani, married, 1 son and 1 daughter 
Sheikha Sara bint Khalid Al Thani, she has 2 sons and 1 daughter
Sheikha Maryam bint Khalid Al Thani

References

External links 
 

Khalid Bin Hamad
1935 births
Living people
Government ministers of Qatar